Eugene Tucker McEver (September 15, 1908 – July 12, 1985) was an American football player and coach.  He played college football at the University of Tennessee, where he was an All-American halfback.  McEver served as the head football coach at Davidson College from 1936 to 1943 and at the University of North Carolina at Chapel Hill in 1944, compiling a career record of 22–54–5.  He was elected to the College Football Hall of Fame as a player in 1954.

Playing career
McEver attended Virginia High School, just outside of Bristol, Tennessee.  He was the first-ever  All-American for the Tennessee Volunteers football team.  He played for the Volunteers in 1928, 1929, and 1931 under Robert Neyland, missing the 1930 season with a knee injury.  McEver scored 130 points for the Vols in 1929, helping them to a 9–0–1 record. The total led the NCAA in scoring that season, and his mark still stands at the single season scoring record at Tennessee. In December 2008, Sports Illustrated undertook to identify the individuals who would have been awarded the Heisman Trophy in college football's early years, before the trophy was established.  McEver was selected as the would-be Heisman winner for the 1929 season. McEver also holds the record for career scoring at Tennessee among non-kickers.  McEver finished his career at Tennessee with 44 touchdowns and 12 points after touchdown for 276 points. He was named to the All-Southern team in 1928, 1929, and 1931, joining teammates Bobby Dodd and Herman Hickman. He stood 5'10", weighed 185 pounds, and wore number 28.

Coaching career
McEver coached at Davidson College in North Carolina from 1937 through 1943.  His record there was 21–47–4. McEver also coached the University of North Carolina to a 1–7–1 record in 1944.  He was an assistant coach at Virginia Tech from 1945 to 1947.

Head coaching record

See also
 List of NCAA major college football yearly scoring leaders

References

External links
 
 

1908 births
1985 deaths
All-American college football players
American football halfbacks
Davidson Wildcats football coaches
North Carolina Tar Heels football coaches
Tennessee Volunteers football players
Virginia Tech Hokies football coaches
All-Southern college football players
College Football Hall of Fame inductees
Sportspeople from Birmingham, Alabama
People from Bristol, Virginia
People from Davidson, North Carolina
Coaches of American football from Virginia
Players of American football from Birmingham, Alabama